Gusum is a locality situated in Valdemarsvik Municipality, Östergötland County, Sweden with 1,175 inhabitants in 2010. Gusum is the site of the now-defunct foundry Gusums Bruk.

References

External links

Gusum information portal (in Swedish)

Populated places in Östergötland County
Populated places in Valdemarsvik Municipality